In the Syriac Orthodox Church, the Archbishop of Jerusalem (originally Bishop of Jerusalem) today bears the additional title of Patriarchal Vicar of the Holy Land and Jordan. The see is currently held by Anthimos Jack Yakoub.

History
The first Syriac Orthodox church in Jerusalem was probably built between the Sasanian conquest (614) and the Islamic conquest (637). The Patriarch Michael the Syrian (died 1199) implies that the church torn down by Harun al-Rashid in 806/807 predated the Islamic conquest. It was soon rebuilt by an Egyptian named Macarius of Naburwah. Since almost all of the known bishops were monks, there must also have been at least a rudimentary monastic community.

The church appears to have been destroyed at the time of the destruction of the Church of the Holy Sepulchre. In 1092, Mansur of Tilbana, another Egyptian, built what was then the only Syriac Orthodox church in the city. In the first quarter of the 12th century, Bishop Ignatius II rebuilt the destroyed church and monastery. It was dedicated to Saint Mary Magdalene and later also to Simon the Pharisee. Shortly after 1125, Ignatius III constructed a hostel with a courtyard across from the church. According to John of Würzburg, writing later in the century, this church was believed to have formerly been the house of Simon the Leper. It is located near the Church of Saint Anne on the northeastern side of the city.

After the Ayyyubid conquest in 1187, the church and monastery were transformed into a Muslim school. The bishops were only able again to occupy it again briefly when the city was in Christian hands between the Sixth Crusade (1229) and the Khwarazmian conquest (1244). Thereafter the Syriac Orthodox used the small church of Saint Thomas of the Germans until it was handed over to the Muslim authorities by the incumbent monk, who converted to Islam in 1451/1452.

The Syriac Orthodox patriarch acquired the Monastery of Saint Mark from the Coptic Orthodox in 1472 and this has served ever since as the church of the bishops of Jerusalem. There was a deputy metropolitan bishop of Jerusalem from the mid-18th century to the office's abolition in 1858, who resided at the monastery of Saint Ananias, then the headquarters of the Syriac Orthodox Patriarchate of Antioch, and was responsible for the collection of donations for the diocese.

Ecclesiastical properties
The following ecclesiastical properties belong to the archdiocese:
Monastery of Saint Mark, Jerusalem
Chapel of Saint Joseph of Arimathea and Saint Nicodemus in the Church of the Holy Sepulchre.
Church of the Mother of God, Bethlehem, Palestine.
Church of Saint Ephrem, Amman, Jordan.

The archdiocese also possesses minor rights of worship at the following churches:
Church of the Nativity
Church of the Tomb of the Virgin Mary

List of bishops
The Syriac Orthodox Register of Episcopal Ordinations only goes back to 793. Michael the Syrian appended to his Chronicle a list of bishops of Jerusalem from James, brother of Jesus, down to his own time. It is identical to the Register for the bishops after 793. The bishops were of metropolitan rank.

In the following list, a date range like 792×818 means "ordained between 792 and 818". Bishops before 793 cannot be dated  at all. The list begins with the first bishop elected in opposition to the Council of Chalcedon (451), but the numbering takes into account the earlier bishops of Jerusalem.

Theodosius (451–453)
Severus (590–635)
Anastasius
Martyrius
Sallustianus
Elias
Cyril II
Jeremy I
Thomas I
John I
Philoxenus I
Timothy I (792×818)
Job (816×845)
Ignatius I (816×846)
Joseph III (816×846)
John II (845×875)
Cyril III Noah (845×875)
Cyriacus
Severus (877×884)
Joseph IV (909×924)
Theodore (909×924)
Cyril IV (922×936)
Jeremy II (935×954)
Thomas II (964×986)
John III (1006×1031)
Philoxenus II (1003×1031)
Zacharias (1041×1058)
Thomas III (1041×1058)
Timothy II (1062×1074)
John IV (1079×1083)
Cyril V (1090×1130)
David (1090×1130)
Ignatius II Hesnun (1090×1130, died 1124/1125)
Ignatius III ibn Busayr of Gadina (1123×1140)
Ignatius IV Romanus (1138×1167)
Athanasius (1167×1200)
Ignatius V Sahdo (1167×1200)
Basil (fl. 1292–1295)
Basil Simon (?–1421/1422)
Gregorius Joseph al-Gurji (–1537)
Gregorius Bahnam
John of Mardin (d. 1577)
Gregorius John of Gargar (d. 1585×1587)
Gregorius Behnam of Arbo (1590–1614)
Abd al-Azal (1640)
Gregorius Abdal Jaleel (1664–1671)
Gregorius Simon II (1679–1692)
Gregorius Simon III of Salah (1693–1719)
Gregorius ‘Abd al-Ahad (1719–1731)
Gregorius Barsoum (1720–1727)
Gregorius Barsoum (1729–1737)
Gregorius Sani’a (1731–1737)
Gregorius Thomas (1737–1748)
Gregorius George (1748–1773)
Gregorius Bishara of Bitlis (1774–1789)
Athanasius Jacob (1785–1797)
Dionysius Jacob (1798)
Cyril ‘Abd al-Ahad (1799–1840)
Deputy: Gregorius Jacob (?–1847)
Deputy: Athanasius Yuhanna (1850–1864)
Gregorius Abded Sattuf (1872–1880)
George Kassab of Sadad (d. 1896)
Iyawannis Elias (1896–1908)
Gregorius Ephrem (1909–?)
Athanasius Yeshue Samuel (1946–1957)
Dionysius Behnan Jijjawi (1957–1996)
Sewerus Malki Mourad (1996–2018)
Gabriel Dahho (2019–2022)
Patriarchal delegate: Anthimos Jack Yakoub (2022–2023)
Anthimos Jack Yakoub (2023–present)

References
Notes

Citations

Bibliography

 
Bishops in Jerusalem